The 1975 Asian Men's Volleyball Championship was the inaugural staging of the Asian Men's Volleyball Championship, a quadrennial international volleyball tournament organised by the Asian Volleyball Confederation (AVC) with Australia Volleyball Federation (AVF). The tournament was held in Melbourne, Australia from 17 to 28 August 1975.

Results

Final standing

References
Results

Asian Men's
Volleyball
Asian men's volleyball championships
Volleyball
Sports competitions in Melbourne